James Rodgers, Jr. (born December 20, 1988) is an American football coach and former wide receiver who is the wide receivers coach for the New Jersey Generals of the United States Football League (USFL). He signed with the Atlanta Falcons as an undrafted free agent following the 2012 NFL Draft. He played college football for Oregon State University. He has also played for the Montreal Alouettes of the Canadian Football League (CFL).  As a coach, he served as the outside linebackers coach for the San Antonio Commanders of the Alliance of American Football in 2019.

High school career
Rodgers attended Lamar Consolidated High School in Richmond, Texas, where he played wide receiver and free safety. He was the 2005 and 2006 District MVP and First-team All-State. He was also a star basketball and track athlete.

College career

Rodgers attended Oregon State University where he majored in speech communication and minored in ethnic studies.

As a freshman in 2007, Rodgers appeared in 13 games, recording 50 rushes for 586 yards, and three touchdowns. He also recorded 19 receptions for 208 yards and one touchdown. He also returned five kickoffs for 122 yards. In 2008, as a sophomore, he appeared in start 12 games. He recorded 46 carries for 408 yards, and five touchdowns. He also recorded 51 receptions for 607 yards, and four touchdowns. He also recorded 33 kickoff returns for 818 yards, and one touchdown. He was named the First-team All-conference as a kick returner. As a junior in 2009, he started 13 games. He recorded 58 carries for 346 yards and one touchdown. He also recorded 91 receptions for 1,034 yards and nine touchdowns. He also recorded 36 kick returns for 840 yards as well as 13 punt returns for 151 yards. In 2010 as a senior, he started four games. He recorded eight carries for 38 yards. He also recorded 16 receptions for 215 yards, and two touchdowns. He also recorded 12 kickoff returns for 344 yards as well as six punt returns for 110 yards, and one touchdown. On October 9, 2010, he suffered a knee injury that ended his season, allowing him to receive a medical redshirt. He returned in 2011, as a redshirt senior and started nine games. He recorded 11 carries for 75 yards. He also recorded 45 receptions for 514 yards and three touchdowns.

In his career at Oregon State, Rodgers set the Oregon State career record with 6,377 all-purpose yards. He was also the first player in school history to record 1,000 yards rushing and 2,000 yards receiving for his career. He also finished his career second on the school's list for career kick return yardage (2,124). He finished third in school history with 19 touchdown receptions. He finished sixth all-time in school history in punt return average (13.7). Recorded 41 consecutive games with a pass reception. He finished fourth in school history in career receiving yards (2,582). He also finished second on the school's all-time career receptions list (222).

College Statistics

Track and field
Rodgers was also a track star at Oregon State. He competed in the 100 meters and the 200 meters, posting personal bests of 10.33 seconds and 22.05 seconds.

Personal bests

Professional career

2012 NFL Combine

Atlanta Falcons
After going undrafted in the 2012 NFL Draft, Rodgers signed with the Atlanta Falcons on April 30, 2012. He was released August 31, 2012. On September 12, he was signed to the Falcons' practice squad, where he spent the entire season. Before the start of the 2013 season, Rodgers was waived again, but he was re-signed to the practice squad.

Montreal Alouettes
Rodgers was signed to the Montreal Alouettes' practice roster on August 6, 2014. In 2014, he appeared in 10 games. He recorded seven receptions for 88 yards and one touchdown. He recorded 12 carries for 60 yards and one touchdown. He also recorded 11 kickoff returns for 206 yards, as well as 58 punt returns for 467 yards, and one touchdown.

Coaching career

Nebraska
In August 2016, Rodgers joined the University of Nebraska athletic department as a graduate manager and player personnel intern.

San Antonio Commanders (AAF)
In 2018, he became the running backs coach for his former college coach, Mike Riley, and the San Antonio Commanders of the Alliance of American Football. Shortly after being hired, he was switched to be the outside linebackers coach.

New Jersey Generals (USFL)
In March of 2022, Rodgers reunited with Riley when he joined his staff as the wide receivers coach for the New Jersey Generals of the USFL.

Personal
Rodgers is the son of Tasha Williams and James Rodgers, Sr. He is also the nephew of retired safety Michael Lewis. He also has three siblings, including Jacquizz Rodgers, a former NFL running back, who he was also teammates with during his tenure at Oregon State.

References

External links
 OSU Beavers football bio
 Atlanta Falcons bio
 Montreal Alouettes bio
 Nebraska Cornhuskers bio

Living people
American football wide receivers
People from Rosenberg, Texas
1988 births
Oregon State Beavers football players
Atlanta Falcons players
Oakland Raiders players
San Antonio Commanders coaches
New Jersey Generals (2022) coaches